Michael Steven Lawrence (born May 28, 1940) is an American bridge player, teacher, theorist, and prolific writer.

Biography
Lawrence was born in San Francisco. He started playing bridge while he was a chemistry student at the University of California; as result of a self-inflicted hand injury, he had to postpone the final exams and started playing bridge as a pastime. Bridge became his major interest and he devoted his subsequent life to it.

In 1968, he was invited by Ira Corn to join the newly formed Dallas Aces team. He formed a partnership with Bobby Goldman, with whom he played a 2/1 game forcing system. They started by winning several North American Bridge Championships and, after a long Italian Blue Team reign, returned the world crown to America by winning the Bermuda Bowls in 1970 and 1971. Lawrence and James Jacoby left the Aces in 1973.

Under Ira Corn's mentorship, Lawrence started teaching bridge and subsequently writing books. He has written more than thirty books. He received numerous book-of-the-year awards starting with his first book, How to Read Your Opponents' Cards. He contributed to the theory of 2/1 game forcing systems, and his "2/1 semi-forcing" approach competes with Max Hardy's "unconditional forcing" approach. Together, they wrote the book Standard Bridge Bidding for the 21st Century in 2000. He also helped develop educational bridge software with Fred Gitelman.
	
In addition to his world championships with the Aces, Lawrence has won another Bermuda Bowl in 1987 in partnership with Hugh Ross along with teammates Hamman, Wolff, Martel, and Stansby.

Bridge accomplishments

Awards

 Herman Trophy (1) 1965

Wins

 Bermuda Bowl (3) 1970, 1971, 1987
 North American Bridge Championships (16)
 von Zedtwitz Life Master Pairs (1) 1984 
 Wernher Open Pairs (1) 1984 
 Grand National Teams (1) 1987 
 Vanderbilt (5) 1967, 1971, 1973, 1977, 1985 
 Mitchell Board-a-Match Teams (2) 1964, 1968 
 Chicago Mixed Board-a-Match (1) 1992 
 Reisinger (4) 1965, 1970, 1977, 1980 
 Spingold (1) 1969

Runners-up

 Bermuda Bowl (2) 1973, 1989
 North American Bridge Championships
 Blue Ribbon Pairs (4) 1965, 1968, 1971, 1983 
 Nail Life Master Open Pairs (1) 1978 
 Jacoby Open Swiss Teams (1) 1994 
 Vanderbilt (1) 1970 
 Keohane North American Swiss Teams (1) 1996 
 Mitchell Board-a-Match Teams (1) 1969 
 Reisinger (1) 1983 
 Spingold (4) 1970, 1976, 1980, 1985

Publications
Dates indicate first and most recent publication.
 How to Read Your Opponent's Cards (1974, 1986)
 Introduction to Contract Bridge and Point Count Bidding (with Gerald Fox, 1975)
 Judgment at Bridge (1976, 1986)
 The Complete Book on Overcalls in Contract Bridge (1979, 2009)
 True Bridge Humor (1980)
 The Complete Book on Balancing in Contract Bridge (1981, 1993)
 Dynamic Defense (1982)
 Play a Swiss Teams of Four with Mike Lawrence (1982, 1993)
 The Complete Book on Hand Evaluation in Contract Bridge (1983, 1993)
 The Jacoby and Texas Transfers Convention (1983)
 The Lebensohl Convention (1983)
 Major Suit Raises (1983)
 Partnership Understandings (1983, 1990)
 Play Bridge with Mike Lawrence (1983)
 Winning Bridge Intangibles (1985), Lawrence and Keith Hanson
 Falsecards (1986, 2003)
 Mike Lawrence's Workbook on the Two Over One System (1987, 1993)
 The Ultimate Guide to Winning Scrabble Brand Crossword Game (1987) (with John Ozag)
 How to Play Card Combinations (1988)
 The Complete Guide to Passed Hand Bidding (1989)
 Mike Lawrences's Bidding Quizzes Volume 1: the Uncontested Auction (1990)
 Topics on Bridge - Series 1-30 (1990, 1992)
 The Complete Guide to Contested Auctions (1992)
 The Complete Book on Takeout Doubles (1994)
 Disturbing Opponents No Trump (1995)
 Mike Lawrence's Opening Leads (1996)
 Opening Leads for Acol Players (with Ron Klinger, 1997)
 Double! New Meanings for an Old Bid (2002)
 I Fought the Law of Total Tricks (2004), Lawrence and Anders Wirgen
 Mike Lawrence Bridge Tips: Tips on Bidding (2015)
 Mike Lawrence Bridge Tips: Tips on Cardplay (2015)
 Mike Lawrence Bridge Tips: Tips on Competitive Bidding (2015)
 Insights on Bridge: Book 1, Moments in Bidding (2019)
 Insights on Bridge: Book 2, Bid, Play, and Defend (2020)
 Insights on Bridge: Book 3, Bid, Play, and Defend (2022)

References

External links
  
 
 Interview by Bridge Bum
 Complete bibliography at Bridge Guys
  – as of October 2014, the text fits another Mike Lawrence [compare LCCN below] whom "Browse this term" credits with the works of both 
 
 

1940 births
American contract bridge players
Bermuda Bowl players
Contract bridge writers
Living people
People from San Francisco
University of California, Berkeley alumni